The 1912 Rutgers Queensmen football team represented Rutgers University as an independent during the 1912 college football season. In their third and final season under head coach Howard Gargan, the Queensmen compiled a 5–4 record and outscored their opponents, 112 to 102.  The team captain was Theodore Van Winkle.

Schedule

References

Rutgers
Rutgers Scarlet Knights football seasons
Rutgers Queensmen football